All The Cube (Hangul: 큐브 통신), also known as Cube Communication, is a South Korean talk show which first ran on July 23, 2020. The program delivers weekly news of Cube Entertainment's artist.

Background
It is a program launched by Cube TV on their 5th anniversary, and artists from Cube such as BtoB, CLC, Pentagon, Yoo Seon-ho and (G)I-dle, and several entertainers, including Lee Hwi-jae, Heo Kyung-hwan, and Park Mi-sun appear as MC and guests. The program delivers from the official news of Cube Entertainment to the extremely private status of artists and interviews. It is a comprehensive information show where fans can discover the hidden charms of each artist and get curious information through photos and videos that cross information and disclosure.

Slogan
 Opening: 'Wi-Fi ON'
 Ending: 'Wi-Fi OFF'

Airtime

Segments
 Fan Sol News - This segment where the MCs deliver the latest news, including comeback, enlistment, casting, etc.
 First Private News - This is a segment where they addressed private information from the public or staff about the idol groups or individual members. Some idols were invited as a guest to discuss their comments.
 Didn't Ask, Don't Care, CUBE & A Talk - This segment has the slogan "Nobody Asked It, Nobody is Curious About It, But to the Fans, It's A Perfect Feast of Baits". The guest will have to answer fans' questions sent through an online form.
Warming-up game - To warm up the guest before Cube & A Talk, several games were played.
 Balance game - It is a game where the guest is given two options to answer them fast. The loser will get hit by a toy hammer. 
 A Blank -  This is a game rule where no foreign words are allowed.
 Threefold Choice Parody game - It is a game where players have to choose a card from 3 different game cards and play the game behind it. Whoever wins twice out of three games will be the winner.
 Parody game - It is a Guess the Picture game. The players were given two questions per game; Guess Whose Eyes, Nose & Mouth, Guess the Super Closeup Food Picture or Guess the Title of the Song. Whoever gets three points fast is the winner.
 Consonant game - It is a game where the players have to match a Korean word with an initial consonant. The players were given two consonants and answered them with three words.
 Cleopatra game - It is a game where players have to sing or scream the phrase "안녕, 클레오파트라. 세상에서 제일 가는 포테이토 칩"  in a lower key than the person before you.
 Jumbled Faces - It is a game where the players have to guess two celebrities from a jumbled picture.
 2 Syllables - It is a game where the players have to guess the two syllables out of 4 syllable words.
 Drawing a Picture with One Heart - It is a game where three players are given the word, and one player will answer; the three players will draw pictures partially in a given time, and the last player will answer only by looking at the picture.
Hidden Card - This segment is where MCs can choose one question about the guest. The name of the segment is changed according to the MC, Seo Eun-kwang is Hidden Card Kwang, Heo Kyung-hwan is Hidden Card Heo, and Lee Chang-sub is Hidden Card Chap.
 Closing Song - This is a segment where the winner recommends a hidden song by a Cube artist and plays it during closing credits.

Casts

MC

Episodes
Note: The episodes aired every Thursday, 9pm KST, real-time broadcast on CUBE TV.
Note 2: Every episode is re-upload with English subtitles on United CUBE (CUBE Entertainment) YouTube official channel.
Note 3: For episodes 12-16, the episode is uploaded into 3 parts: Official News, Didn't Ask, Don't Care, CUBE & A Talk and Closing Song. (Excluding Fan Sol News and First Private News)

Notes

References

External links
@allthatcube_ihq official Twitter
@all_that_cube official Instagram

South Korean variety television shows
South Korean television talk shows
South Korean television news shows
2020 South Korean television series debuts
2020 South Korean television series endings
Korean-language television shows
Television series based on singers and musicians
Cube Entertainment